Jorge Henrique de Almeida Leão (29 October 1982), better known as Jorge Henrique, is a Brazilian footballer who acts as half.

Career

Contract
 Ceará.

See also
Football in Brazil
List of football clubs in Brazil

References

External links
zerozerofootball.com

1982 births
Brazilian footballers
Living people
Ceará Sporting Club players
Association football midfielders
People from Campo Grande
Sportspeople from Mato Grosso do Sul